The  Vanniyar is a river that rises in the Shevaroy Hills in the Salem district in India, flows through the  Dharmapuri district and then into the South Pennar River in the Krishnagiri district. This river is also considered as sacred rivers as it is a tributary of river Krishna Bhadra also known as South Pennar.

References

See also 
List of rivers of Tamil Nadu

Rivers of Tamil Nadu
Krishnagiri district
Rivers of India